Villa Unión is one of the 38 municipalities of Coahuila, in north-eastern Mexico. The municipal seat lies at Villa Unión. The municipality covers an area of 1540.3 km².

As of 2005, the municipality had a total population of 6,138.

On November 29, 2019, four police officers and seven armed civilians, members of the Cartel del Noreste, were killed in a shootout during an attack on the Villa Unión Municipal palace. Six other police officers were injured.

References

Municipalities of Coahuila